Rabbi Shmuel Menachem Butman (born 1944) is a Chabad rabbi in Crown Heights, Brooklyn, New York. He is the director of Lubavitch Youth Organization. He has served for many years as the director of the L'Chaim weekly magazine.

Activities 
He is chairman of the International Campaign to Bring Moshiach.  He was the founder of the weekly Chabad magazine L'Chaim and has made campaign contributions to former New York Mayor Rudy Giuliani.

He is the organizer of the annual Mitzvah Tank Parade. He also hosts a weekly radio show called Moshiach in the air and has been the director of the weekly chabad magazine L'Chaim since the 1980s. His weekly "Challenge" column is published in the Jewish Press.

In 1992 he addressed the US House of Representatives at the invitation of Chuck Schumer, representing Chabad in honor of Schneerson's 90th birthday.

Crown Heights riot 
He gave a keynote address at the funeral of Yankel Rosenbaum. He praised the actions of the police but voiced anger against the rioters comparing their actions to European pogroms in the 19th century. "First Crown Heights, then Washington Heights, then the Golan Heights. This is a Jewish issue. What happened in Crown Heights was not an isolated incident." He commented: "This is not Poland in 1881. It's the United States in 1991!"

Messianism 
Before Schneerson's death Butman was active in the movement to crown him as "King Messiah". He was seen as a leader of that movement, organizing rallies to bring about this proclamation. He invoked the recitation of the Yechi slogan in Schneerson's presence without him complaining as evidence that he was indeed the Messiah. He organized the rally on January 30, 1993 that was billed as Schneerson's coronation ceremony. Before the rally he informed the press that "This will be the coronation of the rebbe as Melech haMashiach (King Messiah)." Butman was forced to backtrack during the event, announcing that Schneerson appearance did not represent his acceptance of the role of Messiah. He told the 8,000 assembled followers (plus many more around the world watching via satellite) that the event "is not to be interpreted as a coronation."

Butman penned a book outlining the religious and philosophical justification for believing that Schneerson was the messiah despite his death in 1995.  He made the book freely available online.

When the Rabbinical Council of America denounced messianism within Chabad in 1996, Butman went on the offensive telling the press: "Rabbi Shmuel Butman, chairman of the International Campaign to Bring Moshiach, responded to the RCA by saying: "Questions of belief in Judaism are a matter of halachah [Jewish law] and should be referred to recognized Torah giants of the generation for a decision" adding that the resolution was "like voting against the rebbe".

He was widely viewed as a spokesman of the messianist strand within Chabad. He told the press in December 1994, after Schneerson's death:
"it is not some of the people in the community, but all of the people in the community as well as Lubavitch throughout the world, who believe...that the Rebbe will take us out of exile, and that the Rebbe will lead us to the great final redemption."

In later years he has been less outspoken in his messianic beliefs. Since February 2008, he presents the weekly web-based Torah program "Shabbos Night Live" on mainstream Chabad websites COLlive.com and COL.org.il.

At the Birchas Hachama ceremony at 770 Eastern Parkway, he was the agreed upon candidate to emcee the rare event.

Family 
Butman is married to Rochel Butman and they have six children together, Velvel, Joseph, Yehudis, Chana, Basya and Haddasa. His son Rabbi Velvel Butman was Executive Director of Chabad Lubavitch Of Westchester of Westchester County  (Westchester County ) until he was removed by Chabad Central Headquarters for refusing to give his wife a Get (Jewish divorce document), his son Rabbi Joseph Butman is the director of Chabad of Armonk, Chappaquah & Pleasantville  (Westchester County, NY); his son-in-law Rabbi Mordechai Newman is the director of Chabad of Alexandria-Arlington in Virginia; his son-in-law Rabbi Bentzion Korf is the principal of Yeshiva Gedolah of Greater Miami in Miami Beach, Florida; his son-in-law Rabbi Yehuda Heber is the director of Chabad of Yorktown, Cortlandt, and Somers (Westchester County, NY).

Bibliography 

 Countdown to Moshiach: Can the rebbe still be Moshiach?, Shmuel Butman (unknown binding - 1995).
Read online here:
http://www.moshiach.net/blind/count.htm

References 

1944 births
Chabad-Lubavitch rabbis
Living people
American Hasidic rabbis